The Judith River Ranger Station is a site on the National Register of Historic Places located along the Middle Fork of the Judith River, southwest of Utica in Lewis and Clark National Forest.  It was added to the Register on April 10, 1992. The location is now used as a campground and the station can be rented as a cabin.

References

Park buildings and structures on the National Register of Historic Places in Montana
National Register of Historic Places in Judith Basin County, Montana
Lewis and Clark National Forest
United States Forest Service ranger stations